Fijian mythology refers to the set of beliefs practiced by the indigenous people of the island of Fiji. Its gods include Degei, a serpent who is the supreme god of Fiji. He is the creator of the (Fijian) world. He judges newly dead souls after they pass through one of two caves: Cibaciba or Drakulu. A few he sends to paradise Burotu. Most others are thrown into a lake, where they will eventually sink to the bottom (Murimuria) to be appropriately rewarded or punished.

References